The 1928 North Dakota Flickertails football team, also known as the Nodaks, was an American football team that represented the University of North Dakota in the North Central Conference (NCC) during the 1928 college football season. In its first year under head coach Charles A. West, the team compiled a 6–1–1 record (4–0 against NCC opponents), won the program's first conference championship, and outscored opponents by a total of 210 to 37.

Three North Dakota players were selected as first-team players on the 1928 All-North Central Conference football team: center Stuart MacMillan; end Willis Shepard; and tackle Eddie Showers. Shepard was also the team captain. 

Back Cy Kahl became the first North Dakota athlete to play in the National Football League, signing with the Portsmouth Spartans in 1930. Two other members of the 1928 team went on to play in the Canadian Football League: Bill Mjogdalen and Curt Schave. 

The 1928 team was inducted in 2003 into the University of North Dakota Athletic Hall of Fame.

Schedule

References

North Dakota
North Dakota Fighting Hawks football seasons
North Central Conference football champion seasons
North Dakota Flickertails football